The 1986 Centennial Cup is the 16th Junior "A" 1986 ice hockey National Championship for the Canadian Junior A Hockey League.

The Centennial Cup was competed for by the winners of the Abbott Cup, Dudley Hewitt Cup, the Callaghan Cup, and a 'Host' team.

The tournament was hosted by the Cole Harbour Colts in the city of Cole Harbour, Nova Scotia.

A note of interest is that Troy Crosby, Sidney's father was the goaltender for the Moncton Hawks in this tournament.  He ended up settling in Cole Harbour, NS which is Sidney's hometown.

The Playoffs

Round Robin

Results
Cole Harbour Colts defeated Penticton Knights 6-5
Orillia Travelways defeated Moncton Hawks 4-3
Cole Harbour Colts defeated Orillia Travelways 9-5
Penticton Knights defeated Moncton Hawks 6-3
Penticton Knights defeated Orillia Travelways 5-2
Cole Harbour Colts defeated Moncton Hawks 5-2

Semi-finals and Final

Awards
Most Valuable Player: Kevan Melrose (Penticton Knights)
Top Scorer: Gary Thomas (Cole Harbour Colts)
Most Sportsmanlike Player: David Shields (Penticton Knights)

All-Star Team
Forward
David Shields (Penticton Knights)
Dwight Lucas (Cole Harbour Colts)
Garry Thomas (Cole Harbour Colts)
Defence
Kevan Melrose (Penticton Knights)
Barry Harrietha (Cole Harbour Colts)
Goal
Corry Amato (Orillia Travelways)

Roll of League Champions
AJHL: Calgary Canucks
BCJHL: Penticton Knights
CJHL: Brockville Braves
IJHL: Summerside Western Capitals
MJHL: Winnipeg South Blues
MVJHL: Cole Harbour Colts
NOJHL: Onaping Falls Huskies
OJHL: Orillia Travelways
PCJHL: Prince George Spruce Kings
SJHL: Humboldt Broncos

See also
Canadian Junior A Hockey League
Royal Bank Cup
Anavet Cup
Doyle Cup
Dudley Hewitt Cup
Fred Page Cup
Abbott Cup
Mowat Cup

External links
Royal Bank Cup Website

1990
Ice hockey competitions in Halifax, Nova Scotia
Cup
1986 in Nova Scotia